The United Nations Children's Fund (UNICEF) is a United Nations agency responsible for providing humanitarian and developmental aid to children worldwide with a presence in more than 190 countries and territories...

In Bangladesh, it was founded in 1952 by the volunteers to advises the Bangladesh Government on policies and legislation which support various programs and commitments under the UN Convention on the Rights of the Child that defines children as human beings, different from adults. Sheldon Yett  is the UNICEF country representative to Bangladesh.

UNICEF in Bangladesh

UNICEF has launched its 7th Fifth Year plan the Sustainable Development Goals in close coordination with the Bangladesh Government. The main goal is to advance the rights of children, especially those who are unheard and disadvantaged.

They are using the life-cycle approach, in which activities are organised to provide support to children based on their age group. The approach identifies specific priorities and plans for each age group, like infants and their mothers, children at primary school age, and adolescents. These are supported by the rights of children. Yasmin Ali Haque joined UNICEF Bangladesh in 1996; she would go one to become the country representative of UNICEF in India.

UNICEF Bangladesh Campaigns
UNICEF Bangladesh has launched "Every Child ALIVE" a global campaign on 20 February 2018. The goal was to issue an urgent appeal to the government, health care providers, donors, the private sector, families, and businesses to keep every child alive. The global campaign was focus on 10 countries: Bangladesh, Ethiopia, Guinea-Bissau, India, Indonesia, Malawi, Mali, Nigeria, Pakistan, and the United Republic of Tanzania.

UNICEF Bangladesh also launched a national multimedia campaign "Ending Child Marriage" on 31 July 2017

UNICEF Bangladesh Ambassadors

UNICEF Ambassadors are the public figures from various fields like film, television, music, sports, and beyond. They have played a critical role in fundraising for children. Also, they use their talent and fame to advocate, and educate on behalf of UNICEF.

Being a public figure, they help in mobilizing the necessary support to improve the lives of children and ensure their basic human rights

The list of Ambassadors includes Arifa Zaman Moushumi (Actress), Jewel Aich (Magician), Shakib Al Hasan (National Cricket player).

References

External links
 UNICEF India
 UNICEF Canada
 UNICEF Ireland
 UNICEF UK

UNICEF
Organizations established in 1952
Child-related organisations in Bangladesh
Organisations based in Dhaka